Spear Glacier is a glacier between the Hauberg Mountains and Peterson Hills, in southern Palmer Land. Mapped by United States Geological Survey (USGS) from surveys and U.S. Navy air photos, 1961–67. Named by Advisory Committee on Antarctic Names (US-ACAN) for Milton B. Spear, construction electrician at Eights Station in 1965.

Glaciers of Palmer Land